Pravoberezhny District is the name of several administrative and municipal districts in Russia. The name literally means "located on the right bank".

Districts of the federal subjects
Pravoberezhny District, Republic of North Ossetia–Alania, an administrative and municipal district of the Republic of North Ossetia–Alania

City divisions
Pravoberezhny City District, Bratsk, a city district of Bratsk, a city in Irkutsk Oblast
Pravoberezhny Territorial Okrug, a city okrug of Lipetsk, the administrative center of Lipetsk Oblast
Pravoberezhny City District, Magnitogorsk, a city district of Magnitogorsk, a city in Chelyabinsk Oblast

See also
Pravoberezhny (disambiguation)

References